Baby the Rain Must Fall is a 1965 American drama film directed by Robert Mulligan and starring Lee Remick, Steve McQueen and Don Murray. Dramatist Horton Foote, who wrote the screenplay, based it on his 1954 play The Traveling Lady. This is Glen Campbell's film debut, in an uncredited role.

Plot
Georgette Thomas (Lee Remick) and her six-year-old daughter Margaret Rose (Kimberly Block) travel from the East Texas town of Tyler to (unknown to him) meet her husband Henry Thomas (Steve McQueen) in his small coastal prairie southeastern Texas hometown of Columbus, Texas. Henry is a somewhat irresponsible rockabilly singer/guitarist, who has recently been released from prison after serving time for stabbing a man during a drunken brawl, and wasn't thinking of Georgette at all.

Henry tries to make a home for his family (he seemed to be practically unaware of his daughter), but Kate Dawson (Georgia Simmons), the aging spinster who raised him after his parents died, remains a formidable presence in his life and tries to sabotage his efforts. She threatens repeatedly to have him returned to prison if he fails to acquiesce to her demands to give up singing, go to night school, and get a real job. He resists this, and convinces Georgette he will be a star someday, as he continues playing and working a part-time job with the Tillmans. When Kate Dawson finally dies, the evening after the funeral Henry drunkenly destroys her possessions (several shots show the belt she beat him with, untouched, hanging on a door near her bedroom), leaves with the silver willed to Catherine, then wrecks his car on the cemetery gate and repeatedly stabs her grave with a knife in hysteria while, unbeknownst to him, his wife is nearby watching this in horror.

Henry is destined for prison again, and Georgette and Margaret Rose leave Columbus in a car driven by Henry's childhood friend, the local sheriff's deputy, Slim (Don Murray). Slim had tried to help straighten Henry out, since before the arrival of Georgette and Margaret Rose to Columbus at the beginning of the film, and failed.  Georgette had done her best to love and gently comfort her self-tortured and cold husband Henry, unsuccessfully.

In the final scene, after an indeterminate time has passed and they have loaded their vehicle and driven away from the rented house, Georgette sees Henry (as does Slim) in the barred back of a sheriff's vehicle at a road crossing stop and turns Margaret Rose away before she sees him, bound on his way back to "the pen".

As they drive out of town and enter the open highway, Georgette answers Margaret Rose's question of where they're going; that they are driving away, to the warm Rio Grande Valley, to begin a new life together. Georgette tells Margaret Rose that they have traveled a long way, from Lovelady to Tyler, from Tyler to Columbus, and now to the distant Valley (Lovelady is Georgette's hometown, and where she and Henry met and married), and notes to the child that nobody could say they don't get around.

Cast

Production
The film was shot on location in the Texas cities of Columbus, Bay City, Wharton, and Lockhart, and a scene where Lee Remick works at a hamburger joint was filmed at the Baskin-Robbins ice cream store in Tarzana, California.

Many of the scenes were filmed in Columbus, the movie's actual locale. The scenes of the Colorado County Courthouse, the downtown store and bus shots (to the west of the Courthouse, on Milam St.), the Tillman's house scenes (a block away from the Courthouse), and those of the Columbus Cemetery. A significant evening scene, in which late-working Deputy Slim and Judge Ewing walk away from the Courthouse towards the street, shows a notable Columbus building (now museum) across Spring Street, the historic 1886 Stafford-Miller House. Some of the downtown scenes show another notable Columbus building in the background, the 1886 Stafford Opera House (which is next to the Stafford-Miller House, both south of the Courthouse), especially the morning scenes in front of the real estate office.

The last part of the "goodbye" scene, where Henry leaves deputy Slim, the sheriff, Georgette and Margaret Rose behind and takes off running, trips, then grabs onto the back of a flatbed truck, falls to the road, and is captured by Slim, was actually filmed in Wharton; at the (southern) beginning of Texas Farm to Market Road 102, (FM-102). The isolated country rental house scenes where Henry, Georgette and Margaret Rose live together were filmed near Bay City, just inland of the Gulf coast, and south of Wharton and Columbus.

The title song, with music composed by Elmer Bernstein and lyrics written by Ernie Sheldon, was performed by Glenn Yarbrough during the opening credits. Yarborough's recording reached #12 on the Billboard Hot 100 and #2 on the Easy Listening chart. An instrumental version of the title song is used on some versions of film.

As a side note, in one scene where McQueen sings at a bar with his rockabilly band, one of his bandmates (to Henry's right) is singer-songwriter Glen Campbell, who is extremely visible standing behind McQueen in a close two-shot but is uncredited in the film. The band drummer, also uncredited, is fellow session musician Hal Blaine, both members at that time of the famed Los Angeles-based "Wrecking Crew." The songs McQueen sung were dubbed by Wrecking Crew member Billy Strange despite not remotely sounding like McQueen except when singing 
a song directly to his character's child later in the film, during which the singing matches McQueen's voice perfectly.

Lee Remick had top billing in the film itself but Steve McQueen had it for the posters, similar to the arrangement for John Wayne and James Stewart in The Man Who Shot Liberty Valance three years earlier.

Critical reception
Bosley Crowther, film critic for The New York Times, wrote "As honest and humble as is the effort to make the viewer sense a woman's baffled love for a shifty and mixed-up fellow in Baby, the Rain Must Fall, there is a major and totally neglected weakness in this film from a Horton Foote play that troubles one's mind throughout the picture and leaves one sadly let-down at the end. It is the failure of the screenwriter--Mr. Foote himself--to clarify why the object of the woman's deep affection is as badly mixed-up as he is and why the woman, who seems a sensible person, doesn't make a single move to straighten him out...Granting that the wife is astonished and distressingly mystified at the neurotic behavior of her husband, this doesn't mean that the viewer is satisfied to be kept in the dark as to the reasons for the stark and macabre goings-on...As it is, we only see that these two people are frustrated and heart-broken by something that's bigger than the both of them. But we don't know what it is."

The staff at Variety wrote the film's chief assets were "outstanding performances by its stars and an emotional punch that lingers...Other cast members are adequate, but roles suffer from editorial cuts (confirmed by director) that leave sub-plots dangling."

See also
List of American films of 1965

References

External links
 
 
 
 
 
 

1965 films
1965 drama films
American drama films
American black-and-white films
Columbia Pictures films
1960s English-language films
Films scored by Elmer Bernstein
American films based on plays
Films directed by Robert Mulligan
Films set in Texas
Films shot in Texas
Films with screenplays by Horton Foote
1960s American films